Ready? OK! is a 2008 comedy film written, edited, and directed by James Vasquez, and produced by Daisy 3 Pictures.

Plot
Andrea Dowd (Carrie Preston), a single parent, is struggling to raise her ten-year-old son, Joshua (Lurie Poston). Andrea's concerned about Joshua's interests. Instead of wanting to be on the school wrestling team, Joshua strives to be on the cheerleading squad. When students are told to come to school dressed as an influential role model, Joshua chooses Maria von Trapp. The film explores Andrea's internal battle of wanting her son to be "normal," and embracing his individuality and accepting him as he is.

Cast
 Michael Emerson as Charlie New
 Carrie Preston as Andrea Dowd
 Lurie Poston as Joshua Alexander "Josh" Dowd
 John G. Preston as Alex Dowd
 Kali Rocha as Halle Hinton
 Tara Karsian as Sister Vivian
 Sandra Ellis-Troy as Emily Dowd
 Sam Pancake as Mabel
 Stephanie D'Abruzzo as Normal Heights vocalist

Production
The film is loosely based on a short film of the same name. The short film is available on the DVD, First Out 3.

Awards
 Best US Narrative Feature Film: 2008 FilmOut San Diego
 Best Actress (Carrie Preston): 2008 FilmOut San Diego
 Outstanding Emerging Talent (James Vasquez): 2008 FilmOut San Diego
 Best of NewFest - Encore Screening at Brooklyn Academy of Music: 2008 NewFest NYC
 Best Male Feature Film: 2008 North Carolina GLFF
 Best Narrative Feature Film (Jury Award): 2008 Seattle Lesbian & Gay Film Festival

Release
 FilmOut San Diego - April 17, 2008
 Q Cinema Fort Worth Gay and Lesbian International Film Festival - June 1, 2008
 2008 NewFest NYC - June 7, 2008
 Frameline Film Festival - June 24, 2008
 Cinequest Film Festival - March 6, 2009

Ready? OK! premiered on television on November 15, 2009 on the cable LGBT-related channel Logo.

References

External links
 
 

2008 films
2008 comedy films
2000s coming-of-age comedy films
2000s teen comedy films
American coming-of-age comedy films
American teen comedy films
American teen LGBT-related films
Features based on short films
LGBT-related comedy films
LGBT-related coming-of-age films
2008 LGBT-related films
2000s English-language films
2000s American films